Wallace is a town in Duplin and Pender counties in the U.S. state of North Carolina. The population was 3,880 at the 2010 census.

The Pender County portion of Wallace is part of the Wilmington Metropolitan Statistical Area.

History
The W. Stokes Boney House, Isaac M. Powers House, and Wallace Commercial Historic District are listed on the National Register of Historic Places.

Geography
Wallace is located in southern Duplin County at  (34.737248, -77.994627). The town limits extend south into Pender County.

U.S. Route 117 passes through the center of town, leading north  to Warsaw and south  to Burgaw. North Carolina Highway 41 crosses US 117 in the center of Wallace, and leads northeast  to Chinquapin and west  to Harrells. I-40 leads south  to Wilmington and north  to Raleigh.

Wallace's mayor is Jason Wells.

Demographics

2020 census

As of the 2020 United States census, there were 3,413 people, 1,492 households, and 833 families residing in the town.

2000 census
As of the census of 2000, there were 3,344 people, 1,329 households, and 862 families residing in the town. The population density was 1,299.5 people per square mile (502.4/km). There were 1,440 housing units at an average density of 559.6 per square mile (216.3/km). The racial makeup of the town was 55.65% White, 28.26% African American, 0.06% Native American, 0.24% Asian, 14.06% from other races, and 1.73% from two or more races. Hispanic or Latino of any race were 18.18% of the population.

There were 1,329 households, out of which 28.3% had children under the age of 18 living with them, 44.0% were married couples living together, 15.3% had a female householder with no husband present, and 35.1% were non-families. 31.2% of all households were made up of individuals, and 17.5% had someone living alone who was 65 years of age or older. The average household size was 2.42 and the average family size was 2.96.

In the town, the age distribution of the population shows 23.6% under the age of 18, 8.6% from 18 to 24, 27.0% from 25 to 44, 21.7% from 45 to 64, and 19.1% who were 65 years of age or older. The median age was 38 years. For every 100 females, there were 85.6 males. For every 100 females age 18 and over, there were 81.6 males.

The median income for a household in the town was $25,422, and the median income for a family was $33,413. Males had a median income of $29,226 versus $16,250 for females. The per capita income for the town was $14,380. About 18.8% of families and 23.3% of the population were below the poverty line, including 26.6% of those under age 18 and 26.1% of those age 65 or over.

Notable people
 Henry Boney (1903–2002), Major League Baseball pitcher
 Wray Carlton (born 1937), former running back for the Buffalo Bills
 M. L. Carr (born 1951), NBA player and two-time NBA champion
 Nate Irving (born 1988), NFL linebacker
 James R. Jordan Sr. (1936–1993), father of NBA star Michael Jordan
 Mary Lee Mills (1912–2010), American nurse
 Charles S. Murphy (1909–1983), White House Counsel to U.S. President Harry S. Truman
 Javonte Williams (born 2000), running back for the Denver Broncos

Radio stations
 710 AM / 100.5 FM WKOO Surge Radio – Adult Top 40 & Dance Hits (AM tower in Rose Hill on Highway 117, FM tower near River Landing in Wallace)
 90.9 FM WGXO Go Mix! – Southern gospel (tower located near River Landing in Wallace, operates on same tower as 100.5 FM)
 94.3 FM WZKB La Mega – Regional Mexican (tower located near Stockyards in Wallace)

References

External links
Town of Wallace official website

 

Towns in Duplin County, North Carolina
Towns in Pender County, North Carolina
Towns in North Carolina
Cape Fear (region)